Ramshaw is a small village in County Durham, in England. It is situated to the south of Hunstanworth, a few miles west of Consett.

Lead mining was an important industry from the 1650s. The London Lead Company operated in the area from the 1700s to the 1850s when the Derwent Mining Company took over. By the 1950s mining had ceased. The mine workings area is a scheduled monument.

The mine manager’s house still exists, built in the 1840s.

References

Villages in County Durham